Hartwell railway station is located on the Alamein line in Victoria, Australia. It serves the eastern Melbourne suburb of Camberwell, and it opened on 7 May 1906 as Hartwell Hill. It was renamed Hartwell on 1 August 1909.

Hartwell is the only station on the Alamein line to have an island platform.

History

Hartwell station opened on 7 May 1906, and was originally served by a train consisting of a locomotive and one or two carriages, dubbed the Deepdene Dasher, which operated between Ashburton and Deepdene. After the line from Camberwell to Ashburton was electrified in 1924, Hartwell was served by electric trains on the Ashburton line, which was extended to Alamein in 1948.

Hartwell is named after one of the early estates in the area, "Hartwell House", the residence of James Irwin who, in the mid-1850s, owned and operated Irwin's Hotel, located on the corner of Norwood (now Toorak) and Wattle Valley Roads, and which was demolished about the time the railway line was built. In the 1850s, Hartwell was a small hamlet known as "Back Creek", named after the nearby creek. Minutes of meetings from the Boroondara District Roads Board noted that "c/- Irwin Hotel, Back Creek" was used as a polling station.

The station building was originally at Walhalla, the terminus of the Walhalla line, but was moved to Hartwell in December 1938, six years before the Walhalla line closed in 1944. Until the Alamein line was converted from single to double track in 1954 (to Ashburton) and 1955 (to Riversdale), Hartwell was the only crossing loop on the line.

On 27 December 1948, a derailment occurred at the Flinders Street (Up) end of the station, when the two front bogies of an Alamein-bound train derailed near a set of points.

Platforms and services

Hartwell has one island platform with two faces. It is serviced by Metro Trains' Alamein line services.

Platform 1:
  weekday all stations and limited express services to Flinders Street; all stations shuttle services to Camberwell

Platform 2:
  all stations services to Alamein

References

External links
 
 Melway map at street-directory.com.au

Railway stations in Melbourne
Railway stations in Australia opened in 1906
Railway stations in the City of Boroondara